The Red Kebaya is a 2006 Malaysian period drama film released by Golden Screen Cinemas, directed by Oliver Knott and produced by Andre Berly and Ramli Hassan. The film premiered in Malaysian cinemas on 23 November 2006 and is rated PG13.

Plot summary
Latiff (Ramli Hassan) is a famous but lonely photographer who was orphaned as a small child. He sets out on an expedition to photograph abandoned houses around Malaysia. On his journey he is haunted by images and sounds that remind him of his traumatic childhood. At one particular house on the island of Penang, Latiff is magically transported back over 50 years to witness the shocking events that occurred there. Through his experience, Latiff comes to understand the significance of the Red Kebaya, a traditional Malay outfit, and the tragic circumstances that led to him being orphaned.

Cast

Main
 Ramli Hassan as Latiff
 Vanida Imran as Azizah
 Bob Mercer as John Reynolds
 Samantha Schubert as Davina Reynolds

Supporting
 Zahim Albakri as Hoggy
 Sabera Shaik as Amber
 Fauziah Nawi as Makcik
 Elaine Daly as Nurul
 Patrick Teoh as Loong
 Jo Kukathas as Shanti
 Sham Sunder as Maniam
 Paula Malai Ali as Dorothy Chapman
 Stuart Payne as David Chapman
 Mohd Afif Abdul Halim as young Latiff
 Farah Ahmad as dancer 1

Production crew
 Producers: Andre Berly and Ramli Hassan
 Original Music: Abbs Abdali
 Cinematography: Raja Muhkriz Raja Ahmad
 Film Editing: Kate James
 Sound Department: Vincent Poon and Alex Thong
 Visual Effects: Jamie Hediger and Michelle Hunt
 Digital Producer: Jonathan Dixon
 Music-score engineer/technician: Matthew J Clinch

Production
Principal photography took 35 days, shooting was done entirely in Malaysia. Actor Bob Mercer had only 3 weeks to learn and memorise his lines in Malay.

Initially the owners of the Cheong Fatt Tze Mansion were reluctant to have their premise used for filming. But after a series of meetings and much persuasion that lead them to better understand the concept of the movie, they finally allowed the crew and cast in.

The film's budget is an estimated RM1.5 million.

Awards and nominations
20th Malaysian Film Festival (2007)
 Best Film
 Best Actress - Vanida Imran (WON)
 Best Actor - Ramli Hassan
 Best Actor in a Supporting Role - Zahim Albakri
 Best Actress in a Supporting Role - Samantha Schubert
 Best Sound Effects - Addaudio Ex. (WON)
 Best Costume Designer/ Garment - Shamsu Yusof (WON)
 Best Poster (WON)
 Best Cinematography - Raja Mukhriz Raja Ahmad Kamaruddin
 Best Original Music Score - S. Atan
 Best Original Theme Song - S. Atan

External links
 
 Review: A Sentimental, Contemporary Malaysian Story
 Filem "The Red Kebaya" meningkatkan Industri Pakaian tradisi Kebaya 

2006 films
2006 drama films
Malay-language films
Malaysian drama films
2000s English-language films